Ayumi Kamiya (born ) is a Japanese female weightlifter, most recently competing in the 76 kg division at the 2018 World Weightlifting Championships.

Major results

References

1992 births
Living people
Japanese female weightlifters
Weightlifters at the 2014 Asian Games
Weightlifters at the 2018 Asian Games
Asian Games competitors for Japan
20th-century Japanese women
21st-century Japanese women